Malfourd Whitney "Bo" Trumbo (born November 18, 1954) was a Circuit Court judge in the 25th circuit of Virginia, which includes the counties of Botetourt, Craig, Rockbridge, Alleghany, Bath and Highland, and the cities of Lexington, Buena Vista and Covington.  A Fincastle lawyer, Trumbo was appointed to replace Judge Duncan Byrd Jr., who died in a 2004 traffic accident in Bath County. Trumbo's appointment was for eight years. He previously served a term in the Virginia House of Delegates and three terms in the State Senate as a Republican.

He graduated from the College of William and Mary (A.B., J.D.).

References

1954 births
Living people
College of William & Mary alumni
William & Mary Law School alumni
Republican Party members of the Virginia House of Delegates
Politicians from Staunton, Virginia
Republican Party Virginia state senators
Virginia circuit court judges